Marcos Ondruska (born 18 December 1972) is a former tennis player from South Africa, who turned professional in 1989. He represented his native country at the 1996 Summer Olympics in Atlanta, Georgia, where he defeated Goran Ivanišević in the first round before falling to Norway's Christian Ruud. The right-hander won four career titles in doubles, and reached his highest singles ATP-ranking on 10 May 1993, when he became the number 27 of the world and reached the semi-finals at the Miami Open.

Ondruska has a 13–7 career Davis Cup record in 11 ties.

Junior Grand Slam finals

Singles: 1 (1 runner-up)

Doubles: 2 (2 runner=ups)

ATP career finals

Singles: 3 (3 runner-ups)

Doubles: 6 (4 titles, 2 runner-ups)

ATP Challenger and ITF Futures Finals

Singles: 8 (7–1)

Doubles: 27 (14–13)

Performance timelines

Singles

Doubles

External links
 
 
 

1972 births
Living people
South African male tennis players
Tennis players at the 1996 Summer Olympics
Olympic tennis players of South Africa
Hopman Cup competitors
Sportspeople from Bloemfontein